Massimo Brambilla (born 4 March 1973) is an Italian professional football coach and former player who is the head coach of  club Juventus Next Gen. As a player, he played as an attacking midfielder.

Club career 
Brambilla grew up in the football youth academy of Monza, and he was promoted to the first team for the 1990–91 season, taking part in the Serie C1 championship that season, and conquering Serie B promotion the year after. He stayed at Monza for two and a half more seasons, two of which were in Serie B, and a half season in C1, when in January 1995, he was acquired by Reggiana (then in Serie A), deciding to leave his hometown club, in order to play football in the top Italian division.

With Reggiana, Brambilla played half of the 1994–95 Serie A season, as the team was relegated to the lower divisions, and he was subsequently purchased by Parma. In the 1995–96 Serie A season, he made 26 league appearances, and the next season he initially remained at Parma, but in January, after having spent much time on the bench, and only making 9 appearances, he was purchased outright by Serie A newcomers Bologna, with whom he played an excellent second half of season, collecting 14 appearances, and managing a 7th-place finish in Serie A.

In the summer of 1997, Italian star Roberto Baggio transferred to Bologna, and Brambilla remained somewhat on the sidelines, collecting only 2 full appearances during the start of the 1997–98 Serie A season. In October, he moved to a Torino side that had strong ambitions to obtain promotion to Serie A, and in his first season with the club, Brambilla made 26 appearances, scoring 2 goals. On the final matchday of the Serie B championship, however, he suffered a serious accident which also affected him the following season, as he only took part in the club's last 11 fixtures of the 1998–99 Serie B season, but still contributing to help Torino obtain Serie A promotion after 3 years in Serie B.

The following season, he obtained 28 appearances in the top flight, failing however to avoid the immediate relegation of his team to Serie B. The following year, the team is entrusted to Luigi Simoni, who often left the midfielder on the bench, only using him in the final minutes of matches. The team struggled to take off, and Simoni's position was increasingly at risk, resulting in his dismissal. The team was subsequently entrusted to Camolese, who made Brambilla a key member of the starting line-up, as Torino won the 2000–01 Serie B title, also obtaining Serie A promotion once again.

The following year, despite wearing the number-10 shirt, his relationship with Camolese deteriorates, and he is not played with continuity throughout the 2001–02 Serie A season, only making 8 appearances, although he still contributed to helping the club avoid relegation, and achieve a 2002 UEFA Intertoto Cup spot. At the end of the season, he joined an ambitious Siena side in Serie B, as the Tuscan club won an historic first promotion to Serie A that season.

Despite his fine season, he was later sold to Cagliari in Serie B, collecting 40 appearances in his first season with the club, helping Cagliari to obtain Serie A promotion for the first time in 4 years. The next season began way, and saw Brambilla in excellent form, as he was deployed regularly under manager Arrigoni, but from January he was used less frequently, collecting a total of only 17 appearances in Serie A that season. His final match in Serie A coincided with that of club legend Gianfranco Zola, in a 4–2 loss to Juventus.

At the end of the season, he decided to move closer to home by accepting a contract from the newly promoted Mantua side in Serie B, a club with lofty ambitions. Although the club was expected to aim for a mid-table finish, they surprised everyone by remaining at the top of the table until the Christmas break. The team subsequently suffered poor results, but before the end of the championship, the team managed to improve and obtain a place in the play-offs, although they were defeated in the final against Torino, missing the opportunity to obtain Serie A promotion. Brambilla's last season with Mantova was rather mixed, as he collected 25 appearances, but failed to achieve a play-off spot, due to the 10-point difference between the third and fourth placed sides.

In June 2007 his contract expired with Mantua, and on 9 July 2007, he signed a contract to return to end his career with his first club, Monza, in Serie C1.

The following summer, Brambilla signed a contract with Serie C side U. S. Pergocrema 1932, spending 4 seasons with the club before retiring at the end of the 2011–12 Serie C1 season.

International career 
Although he was never capped at senior level, Brambilla played for the Italy Under-21 national football team on 17 occasions between 1993 and 1996, under manager Cesare Maldini. He was notably a member of the squad which won the 1996 UEFA European Under-21 Championship, and he also took part in the Olympic Games in Atlanta, making 2 appearances.

Managerial career
In 2011, he obtained a UEFA A coaching license, made him eligible to coach Lega Pro teams or below. In the 2010–11 season he was the coach of the Giovanissimi national under-16 team of Pergocrema. Following Valter Bonacina's departure as Atalanta Primavera coach, Brambilla was appointed his successor to the job. Prior to his appointment as under-19 coach, Brambilla had served as Atalanta's Allievi (under-17 coach).

After seven years as coach in Atalanta's youth sector, on 28 June 2022, Brambilla was appointed head coach of Juventus U23, the reserve team of Juventus playing in the Serie C.

Managerial stats

Honours

Player 
Monza
 Coppa Italia Serie C: 1990–91

Parma
 Supercoppa Italiana runner-up: 1995

Siena
 Serie B: 2002–03

Italy U21
 UEFA European Under-21 Championship: 1996

Manager 
Atalanta Youth
 Campionato Primavera 1: 2018–19, 2019–20
 Supercoppa Primavera: 2019, 2020

References

External links 
 2006–07 Profile at gazzetta.it 

1973 births
Living people
People from Vimercate
Sportspeople from the Province of Monza e Brianza
Footballers from Lombardy
Italian footballers
Association football midfielders
A.C. Monza players
A.C. Reggiana 1919 players
Parma Calcio 1913 players
Bologna F.C. 1909 players
Torino F.C. players
A.C.N. Siena 1904 players
Cagliari Calcio players
Mantova 1911 players
U.S. Pergolettese 1932 players
Serie A players
Serie B players
Serie C players
Italy under-21 international footballers
Olympic footballers of Italy
Footballers at the 1996 Summer Olympics
Italian football managers
Association football coaches
Atalanta B.C. non-playing staff
Juventus Next Gen managers